Hody-Dobrovidka is a village in Kolomyia Raion of Ivano-Frankivsk Oblast in Western Ukraine. The population of the village is around 967 inhabitants, and local government is administered by Hodo-Dobrovidska village council. It belongs to Piadyky rural hromada, one of the hromadas of Ukraine.

Geography 

History and Attractions 
The village was established in 1939 from the two separate villages, Hody and Dobrovidka. The first written record about Dobrovidka dates back to 1451, and Gody village mentioned in 1857. The village has an architectural monument of local importance of Ivano-Frankivsk region. It is the Church of St. Dmitry 1923 (Wooden). The church belongs to the architectural monuments of local importance. There is also the Church of St. George 1926 (Wooden).

Famous people 
 Petro Dmytrovych Melnychuk (1913-2004) – Candidate of Pharmaceutical Sciences, Associate Professor, Deputy Director for Science of Lviv State Medical Institute (1944-1961), known phytotherapeutist. He graduated from the Lviv University (1939), was twice sentenced to death, once by the Bolsheviks (1941) and once by the German occupiers (1944).

References

External links 
 Hodo-Dobrovidska village council
 weather.in.ua/Hody-Dobrovidka

Villages in Kolomyia Raion